Rongcheng railway station is a railway station in Rongcheng, Weihai, Shandong, China. It opened on 28 December 2014 and is the eastern terminus of the Qingdao–Rongcheng intercity railway. It will also be the eastern terminus of the under construction Laixi–Rongcheng high-speed railway.

References 

Railway stations in Shandong
Railway stations in China opened in 2014